Morenci is a city in Lenawee County in the U.S. state of Michigan. Sharing a southern boundary with the state of Ohio, it is the southernmost city in the state of Michigan. The population was 2,270 at the 2020 census.

History
The settlement of Morenci began in 1833.

Geography

Demographics

2010 census
At the 2010 census, there were 2,220 people, 821 households and 582 families living in the city. The racial makeup of the city was 96.2% White, 1.0% African American, 0.3% Native American, 0.3% Asian, 0.1% Pacific Islander, 0.7% from other races, and 1.4% from two or more races. Hispanic or Latino of any race were 4.5% of the population.

There were 821 households, of which 39.0% had children under the age of 18 living with them, 51.0% were married couples living together, 13.9% had a female householder with no husband present, 6.0% had a male householder with no wife present, and 29.1% were non-families. 25.7% of all households were made up of individuals, and 13% had someone living alone who was 65 years of age or older. The average household size was 2.68 and the average family size was 3.13.

The median age was 34.1 years. 28.7% of residents were under the age of 18; 8.8% were between the ages of 18 and 24; 26.9% were from 25 to 44; 22.2% were from 45 to 64; and 13.4% were 65 years of age or older. The gender makeup was 48.1% male and 51.9% female.

2000 census
At the 2000 census, there were 2,398 people, 877 households and 644 families living in the city. The racial makeup was 97.00% White, 0.13% African American, 0.33% Native American, 0.33% Asian, 0.63% from other races, and 1.58% from two or more races. Hispanic or Latino of any race were 3.50% of the population.

There were 877 households, of which 39.3% had children under the age of 18 living with them, 56.7% were married couples living together, 11.3% had a female householder with no husband present, and 26.5% were non-families. 22.5% of all households were made up of individuals, and 12.8% had someone living alone who was 65 years of age or older. The average household size was 2.68 and the average family size was 3.11.

28.9% of the population were under the age of 18, 9.2% from 18 to 24, 27.8% from 25 to 44, 19.7% from 45 to 64, and 14.4% who were 65 years of age or older. The median age was 34 years. For every 100 females, there were 93.9 males. For every 100 females age 18 and over, there were 83.7 males.

The median household income was $40,050 and the median family income was $46,324. Males had a median income of $33,459 and females $22,288. The per capita income was $16,557. About 7.4% of families and 9.7% of the population were below the poverty line, including 14.4% of those under age 18 and 6.8% of those age 65 or over.

Education
The community is served by Morenci Area Schools. The Morenci Area High School Bulldogs are members of the Tri-County Conference.

Transportation

Notable people
Tony Scheffler, former tight end for the Detroit Lions
Michael Sessions, former 18 year old mayor

Climate
This climatic region is typified by large seasonal temperature differences, with warm to hot (and often humid) summers and cold (sometimes severely cold) winters. According to the Köppen Climate Classification system, Morenci has a humid continental climate, abbreviated "Dfb" on climate maps.

Gallery

References

External links
State Line Observer
City of Morenci Info
Morenci Area Schools

Cities in Lenawee County, Michigan
Populated places established in 1833
1833 establishments in Michigan Territory